Pernersdorf is a town in the district of Hollabrunn in Lower Austria, Austria.

Geography
Pernersdorf lies in the Weinviertel in Lower Austria. Only about 1.06 percent of the municipality is forested.

References

Cities and towns in Hollabrunn District